The individuals listed below have all served in the position of Missouri Attorney General.

List
Parties

References
Official Manual, State of Missouri, 2005-2006.